131 Squadron or 131st Squadron may refer to:

 No. 131 Squadron RCAF, see list of Royal Canadian Air Force squadrons
 No. 131 Squadron RAF, United Kingdom
 131 Squadron (Israel)
 131 Squadron, Republic of Singapore Air Force, see list of Republic of Singapore Air Force squadrons
 131st Aero Squadron, United States Army Air Service
 131st Fighter Squadron, United States Air Force
 131st Rescue Squadron, United States Air Force
 VAQ-131, United States Navy
 VF-131, United States Navy
 VP-131, United States Navy
 VMA-131, United States Marine Corps